Miréréni is a village in the commune of Chirongui on Mayotte, an overseas region of France.

Populated places in Mayotte